Galåa is a village in Røros municipality in Trøndelag county, Norway. The village is to the northeast of the town of Røros and comprises the hamlet of Grakhøjig. It is best known for its prison and hospital. The prison is partly open to visitors and partly used for storage and research purposes. The hospital and hospital infrastructure, including the health centre and some clinical equipment are well maintained.

References

Røros
Villages in Trøndelag